Big two is a card game of Chinese origin.

Big Two may also refer to:

Big Two derby, the Northern Irish football derby between Linfield and Glentoran
Big two of North Region Junior football: Sunnybank F.C. and Banks O' Dee F.C.
Big Two Comics: DC Comics and Marvel Comics

See also

 Big One (disambiguation)
 Big Three (disambiguation)
 Big Four (disambiguation)
 Big Five (disambiguation)
 Big Six (disambiguation)
 Big Seven (disambiguation)
 Big Eight (disambiguation)
 Big Ten (disambiguation)
 Big 12